The second season of the anime series To Your Eternity was announced in the final episode of the first season in August 2021. The plot continues the immortal being Fushi as he encounters mankind after decades of self-exile. The series is based on Yoshitoki Oima's manga series with the same name.

Drive replaced Brain's Base in animating the second season, while Kiyoko Sayama replaced Masahiko Murata as the director. The rest of the main staff are returning from the first season including Shinzō Fujita as series script supervisor, Koji Yabuno as character designer, Ryo Kawasaki as music composer, and Takeshi Takadera as sound director.. It premiered on October 23, 2022. Like with the first season, Crunchyroll is also streaming the second season.

The second season reuses the first season's opening theme, "Pink Blood" by Hikaru Utada, with updated visuals in the opening credits to represent the new story arcs, while Masashi Hamauzu composes the second season's ending theme song, "Roots".


Episode list

Notes

References

To Your Eternity